Gordon Malcolm Keith Dow (born July 1, 1937) is a Canadian former politician. He served in the Legislative Assembly of New Brunswick from 1982 to 1987 as member of the Progressive Conservative party from the constituency of Saint John West.

References

1937 births
Living people
Politicians from Saint John, New Brunswick
Progressive Conservative Party of New Brunswick MLAs